Four referendums were held in Switzerland in 1981. The first was held on 5 April on a popular initiative "for a new policy on foreigners." Known as the "Mitenand Initiative", it was rejected by 84% of voters. The next two referendums were held on 14 June on popular initiatives for gender equality and the protection of consumer rights, both of which were approved. The final referendum was held on 29 November on prolonging the federal finance order, and was also approved.

Results

April: New policy on foreigners

June: Gender equality

June: Consumer protection

November: Financial order

References

1981 referendums
1981 in Switzerland
Referendums in Switzerland